This is a list of county courthouses in Arkansas.  Each county in Arkansas has a city that is the county seat where the county government resides, including a county courthouse. Arkansas also has ten counties which have two county seats and two county courthouses. This is usually due to a capricious river that runs across the county which became impassable at some point in county history.

Former county courthouses
 Jackson County Courthouse, now contained within Jacksonport State Park
 Randolph County Courthouse
 Scott County Courthouse, replaced in 1996
 Washington County Courthouse, replaced in 1994

See also

 List of United States federal courthouses in Arkansas

Arkansas
Courthouses, county